Franziskaner in German means:

 a Franciscan friar or
 a beer brewed by the Spaten-Franziskaner-Bräu.
 a coffee-made beverage also known as espresso con panna